Gilbert Phelps (3 January 1915 – 15 June 1993) was a British educationist and author, best known for nine distinguished novels that he wrote between 1953 and 1975 and for his literary criticism which embraces several foreign literatures, chiefly Russian and African.

Biography

Gilbert Henry Phelps was born in Gloucester, won a scholarship to a grammar school and another to Cambridge where he graduated with a double First in English. He was associated with the university as research student, lecturer and tutor from 1937 to 1939. From 1940 to 1942 he lectured for the British Council in Lisbon. On returning to England he became Senior English Master at Blundell's School.

Gilbert Phelps began writing when he was still at school. His collections of poems and short stories appeared in many periodicals and collections both in America and England. His first novel the Dry Stone was published both in England and America in 1953, as was his second novel A Man in His Prime. He has written articles on literary and educational subjects, and has also written for the radio. Gilbert Phelps then became Chief Instructor, Sound, for Staff Training at the BBC (British Broadcasting Corporation).

Career with BBC

Phelps' appointments with the BBC included:

Talks Producer, BBC Bristol 1945-50
Supervisor, Educational Talks 1950-52
Producer, Third Programme 1950-53
General Instructor, Staff Training Department, BBC 1953-56
General Instructor 1956-60

Bibliography

  The Dry Stone published in the United Kingdom and then published in America under the title The Heart in the Desert (1954)
  A Man in His Prime published in the United Kingdom by Hutchinson (1955)
  The Centenarians: A Fable  (1958)
  The Love Before the First (1960)
  The Winter People (1963)
  The Russian Novel in English Fiction (Criticism).
  Living Writers (Editor).
  Tenants of the House (1971)
  The Old Believer (published in the U.S. under the title Mortal Flesh) (1973)
  The Low Roads (1975)
  A Short Guide to the World Novel (1988)
   A Short History of English Literature  Folio edition (1962)

Other references
Obituary: Gilbert Phelps, The Independent, 18 June 1993

Footnotes
     

1915 births
1993 deaths
Alumni of the University of Cambridge
English educational theorists
People from Gloucester
English literary critics
English short story writers
20th-century English novelists
20th-century English poets
20th-century British short story writers